The Nokia 3410 is a mobile phone made by Nokia, the successor of the popular Nokia 3310. It was announced at CEBIT on 12 March 2002. The 3410 was the first Java phone by Nokia, as well as being one of the earliest mobile phones outside Japan to feature 3D graphics and an image editor. The Nokia 3410 was never released in the Asia-Pacific region, likely due to variants of the 3310 such as the Nokia 3315, which featured almost the same design cues as the Nokia 3410, as well as Nokia observing tetraphobia in Asian markets where the number four is viewed as unlucky.

Hardware and software 
The Nokia 3410 is compact, but somewhat heavy with a weight of 114 grams with the 825mAh removable Li-Ion battery. It has up and down buttons to assist with menu navigation and a stiff black button on the top of the phone serves as a switch to turn profiles on and off. Its display has a higher definition than its predecessor's with 96×65 pixels (as opposed to 84×48 on the 3310). It also came packed with a WAP 1.1 browser, and basic utilities such as a calculator, alarm clock, stop watch, and countdown timer. It also can store up to 10 notes as reminders and has customizable and downloadable profiles. On the entertainment side it comes with five games (Snake II, Bumper, Space Impact, Bantumi, Link5) and a basic SMS messenger.

3D graphics 
The Nokia 3410 was one of the first mobile phones released outside Japan to feature mobile 3D graphics (notably the animated screensavers and the mobile game Munkiki's Castles). Despite its monochrome screen and a 96×65 screen resolution, it includes almost all of the rendering features from OpenGL ES 1.0, used in only three applications: 3D text generator, animated screensavers and Munkiki's Castles. It uses a proprietary API for the mobile phone to render 3D graphics via the baseband processor (Texas Instruments MAD2WDI C GSM Baseband Processor). However, rendering on this device is only displayed at a lower polygon count (since it uses a software renderer) and it runs slower than other mobile phones that support 3D graphics.

See also
 List of Nokia products

Notes

References

3410